Jakob Woller (1510–1564 in Tübingen) was a German sculptor.
In 1556 he came to Tübingen, to work at the St. George's Collegiate Church, Tübingen.

1510 births
1564 deaths
16th-century German sculptors
German male sculptors
Renaissance sculptors